HID1 domain containing is a protein that in humans is encoded by the HID1 gene.

References

Further reading